Good vs. Evil is the third studio album by American rapper KXNG Crooked (formerly known as Crooked I). The album was released on November 11, 2016 through RBC Records & Entertainment One., marking KXNG Crooked's second release in a year. The album features cameo appearances from notable rappers such as Eminem, RZA, Xzibit, Tech N9ne among other guests.

The album was well received by critics, who praised its direction, dark beats and narrative skills. The album's sequel, Good vs. Evil II, was released on December 8, 2017.

Track listing

References

2016 albums
Crooked I albums